Ewald Wichert (born 26 May 1940) is a German boxer. He competed in the men's middleweight event at the 1968 Summer Olympics.

References

External links
 

1940 births
Living people
German male boxers
Olympic boxers of West Germany
Boxers at the 1968 Summer Olympics
People from Schaumburg
Middleweight boxers
Sportspeople from Lower Saxony